Michael Patrick Carroll is an American businessman. He is chairman and founder of Carroll Org., a US real estate investment company. He also co-owns S.P.A.L., an Italian football team that competes in Serie B.

Early life 
Carroll was born in Richmond, Virginia, in 1979, spent his childhood in Tampa, Florida, and then relocated to Atlanta after graduating from high school.

Career 
In 2004 he founded Carroll Org., a real estate company focused on acquisitions, asset management services, ground-up development, and fund management. The company is headquartered in Atlanta, Georgia, and having regional offices in Houston, New York, Raleigh, and Tampa. The initial concentration of Carroll's acquisitions was on Florida and Georgia, but they rapidly spread throughout the Southeast, including North Carolina and South Carolina. More than $13.1 billion worth of real estate has been successfully acquired, developed, or sold by the company since its founding in 2004. The National Apartment Association awarded CARROLL with one of its NAA Best Places to Work Awards in 2021.

Along with Joe Tacopina, he acquired Società Polisportiva Ars et Labor, commonly known as S.P.A.L. on August 19, 2021. The deal's terms weren't made public.

In 2021, he bought a lakefront Miami Beach home for $16.4M with his partner, model Alina Baikova.

Carroll declared in 2021 that he had signed CEO Action for Diversity and Inclusion, a corporate community-led initiative to enhance diversity and inclusion in the workplace.

References 

1979 births
Living people
American real estate businesspeople